"Bachia" as described by Förster in 1869 is now the cryptine wasp genus Bachiana.

Bachia is a genus of lizards that belong to the spectacled lizards family.

Species
The genus Bachia consists of 31 species:

Bachia alleni 
Bachia barbouri  - Barbour's bachia
Bachia beebei 
Bachia bicolor  - two-colored bachia
Bachia blairi 
Bachia bresslaui  - Bresslau's bachia
Bachia cacerensis )
Bachia didactyla )
Bachia dorbignyi  - Dorbigny's bachia
Bachia flavescens 
Bachia geralista 
Bachia guianensis  - Guyana bachia
Bachia heteropa  - LaGuaira bachia
Bachia huallagana  - Dixon's bachia
Bachia intermedia  - Noble's bachia
Bachia lineata 
Bachia marcelae 
Bachia micromela 
Bachia oxyrhina 
Bachia pallidiceps  - Cope's bachia
Bachia panoplia 
Bachia peruana  - Peru bachia
Bachia psamophila 
Bachia pyburni 
Bachia remota 
Bachia scaea 
Bachia scolecoides ) - Vanzolini's bachia
Bachia talpa ) - Ruthven's bachia
Bachia trinitatis  - Trinidad bachia, Trinidad worm lizard
Bachia trisanale  - Stacy's bachia
Bachia whitei  - White's bachia

Nota bene: A binomial authority in parentheses indicates that the species was originally described in a genus other than Bachia.

References

Further reading
Dixon JR (1973). "A Systematic Review of the Teiid Lizards, Genus Bachia, with Remarks on Heterodactylus and Anotosaura ". Misc. Publ. Univ. Kansas Mus. Nat. Hist. (57): 1-47.
Gray JE (1845). Catalogue of the Specimens of Lizards in the Collection of the British Museum. London: Trustees of the British Museum. (Edward Newman, printer). xxviii + 289 pp. (Bachia, new genus, p. 58).

 
Lizard genera
Taxa named by John Edward Gray